Citadel of Cadusii - the citadel of Cadusii, discovered during archaeological research in Kaluraz in the province of Gilan. It was used as a frontier fortress and protected from the invasion of people from Amardi and Marlik in this region.

History 
The first season of archaeological excavations at Kaluraz led to the discovery of the first architectural plan dating back to the Iron Age (1350-800 BC). This historic site has a building with large halls and several rooms. The historical hill Kaluraz, located in Rostam-Abad, is the oldest historical monument of the Gilan province. This historic site was once excavated by Iranian archaeologists in the 1960s, but since it belonged to the official authority of the previous regime, archaeological excavations ceased until recently. Finally, in 2015, drilling and stratigraphic work began in this area. “The discoveries during the first season of excavations at Kaluraz  show that this hill could not have been the residence of ordinary people or even aristocrats. The two-meter citadel surrounding the hill and halls, as well as intricate rooms with brick floors, indicate that this complex was to be the seat of prominent social strata. Taking into account this evidence and the fact that this historic site was a frontier area during the era of the Cadusii  tribe, it is proved that Kaluraz was a government citadel that also played a protective role, ”says Mohammad Reza Khalatbari, director of the prehistoric division of the center for archaeological research and head of the Kaluraz excavation. According to Khalatbari, the Sefidrud River has always played an important role in shaping culture and civilization in Gilan province.

"In the Middle Ages, the Sefidrud River divided the Gilan province into two parts - the Biapas and Biapish regions, the capitals of which were Lahijan and Fuman. Before that and during the first millennium BC, the river divided the Gilan province into two parts. The eastern part was captured by the Amardi tribes, and the western part - by the Cadusii  tribe. The latter were located on the territory of the modern Talish region, "Khalatbari added. Khalatbari believes that Kaluraz, as well as the Pila fortress, located in the historical site of Marlik to the west and east of the Sefidrud River, were two government citadels, which were built in the border zone of this river to protect the borders of the Cadusii  and Amardi.Marlik Tepe, which is considered the first cemetery of the inhabitants of the Pyla fortress, is one of the most important historical monuments of Iran, excavated by Izatolla Negahban in 1961. The bowl from Marlik is one of the most valuable Iranian historical relics found in this area.Archaeologists believe that, most likely, the tribes The Kadusis and Amard often fought among themselves, and government citadels were built in the border zone of the Sefidrud River to protect the borders between the two tribes. Most of the architectural structure of Kalurasa is built of earth and stone, which were also used in some parts, including shell rocks.

Reference 

 “Kadusi”: “Kadusi Governmental Citadel Discovered in Gilan,” at website “Latest archaeological news from Iran,” http://iranarch.blogspot.com/2006/01/ kadusi-governmental-citadel-discovered.html, 16 January 2006.
 A. Hakemi, “Kaluraz and the Civilization of the Mardes,” Archaeologia Viva 1/1, 1968, pp. 63-66.
 Idem, “Excavations in Kaluraz, Gilan,” Bulletin of the Asia Institute of the Pahlavi University 3, 1973, pp. 1-3.
 F. Biglari and S. Shidrang, “The Lower Paleolithic Occupation of Iran,” Near Eastern Archaeology 69/3–4, 2006, pp. 160-68.
 Kaluraz
A. Hakemi, “Kaluraz and the Civilization of the Mardes,” Archaeologia Viva 1/1, 1968, pp. 63-66. 
“Kaluraz”　in “Survey of Excavations in Iran, 1967-8,” IRAN 7, 1969, p. 181. 
Idem, “Excavations in Kaluraz, Gilan,” Bulletin of the Asia Institute of the Pahlavi University 3, 1973, pp. 1-3.

Sources 

 Negahban E. O. A preliminary report on Marlik excavation. Tehran, 1964
 idem. Marlik: the complete excavation report. Phil., 1996. Vol. 1–2; Dandamaev M.A., Lukonin V.G. Culture and Economy of Ancient Iran. M., 1980
 Frye R.N. The legacy of Iran. M., 2002
 Kadusi Governmental Citadel Discovered in Gilan
 Marlik

Cadusii